Paek Hak-rim (October 1918 – October 5, 2006) was the Deputy Director of the North Korean Ministry of Public Security.  He occupied a number of high-ranking positions, including serving from 1998 to 2003 on the National Defense Commission. He was also the Minister of People's Security from 1998 to 2003.

Biography
Paek was born in South Pyongan Province, and served in the guerrilla armies of the Korean independence movement before 1945.  He also served in the North Korean army after independence, reaching the rank of Major General in 1958 and Lieutenant General in 1962. In 1962, he was appointed Director of the Political Security Bureau of the Ministry of National Defense and promoted to lieutenant general. In March 1970, he was appointed Deputy Minister of Social Security. In November 1970, he was elected to the Central Committee of the Workers' Party of Korea, and in August 1978, he was appointed deputy Minister of the People's Armed Forces. In 1992 he was promoted to the rank of Vice Marshal. He has been a delegate to the Supreme People's Assembly following the 4th (1967), 7th (1982), 8th (1986), 9th (1990), 10th (1998), and 11th (2003) elections. He joined the Central Committee of the Workers' Party of Korea in 1970, and served on that body continuously beginning in 1980. In April 2000 he was appointed to the Minister of People's Security, a position he held until July 2003.

Paek died of a brain hemorrhage on at 2 PM on October 5, 2006.  The following day a wreath was sent to his funeral by Kim Jong-il, and laudatory obituaries were distributed through the North Korean media.

Works

See also

Politics of North Korea

References

Yonhap News Agency.  "Who's who, North Korea," pp. 787–812 in

External links
 NKChosun profile

1918 births
2006 deaths
Members of the Supreme People's Assembly
People from South Pyongan
Korean independence activists
Government ministers of North Korea
Members of the 6th Politburo of the Workers' Party of Korea
Members of the 5th Central Committee of the Workers' Party of Korea
Members of the 6th Central Committee of the Workers' Party of Korea
People of 88th Separate Rifle Brigade